Moritz Geisreiter (born 30 December 1987) is a German speed skater.

Geisreiter competed at the 2014 Winter Olympics for Germany. In the 5000 metres he finished 10th, and in the 10000 metres he was 8th.

As of September 2014, Geisreiter's best performance at the World Single Distance Championships is 4th, in the 2012 10000 metres. His best finish at the World All-Round Championships is 18th, in 2013.

Geisreiter made his World Cup debut in December 2007. As of September 2014, Geisreiter's best World Cup finish is 4th, in a 5000 m race at Inzell in 2012–13. His best overall finish in the World Cup is 9th, in the 2011–12 5000 & 10000 m Cup.

References

External links 
 
 
 

1987 births
Living people
German male speed skaters
Speed skaters at the 2014 Winter Olympics
Speed skaters at the 2018 Winter Olympics
Olympic speed skaters of Germany
People from Bad Reichenhall
Sportspeople from Upper Bavaria
21st-century German people